= Charles Landesman =

American philosopher (born 1932)

- Born: 17 December 1932; Brooklyn, New York
- Occupation: Philosopher

Charles Landesman (born 17 December 1932) is an American philosopher. He is professor emeritus of philosophy at Hunter College.

Landesman was born in Brooklyn, New York. He obtained a BA from Wesleyan University in 1954 and a PhD from Yale University in 1959. He was assistant professor at Kansas University (1959–1965) and a professor in the Department of Philosophy at Hunter College from 1970. He has defended philosophical dualism.

== Selected publications ==
- Readings in the Theory of Action (Indiana University Press, 1968)
- The Foundations of Knowledge (Prentice-Hall, 1970)
- The Problem of Universals (Basic Books, 1971)
- Discourse and its Presuppositions (Yale University Press, 1972)
- Philosophy: An Introduction to the Central Issue (Holt Rinehart and Winston, 1985)
- Color and Consciousness: An Essay in Metaphysics (Temple University Press, 1989)
- The Eye and the Mind: Reflections on Perception and the Problem of Knowledge (Kluwer Academic Publishers, 1993)
- Introduction to Epistemology (Blackwell, 1996)
- Skepticism: The Central Issues (Wiley, 2002)
- Leibniz's Mill: A Challenge to Materialism (2011)
